Dean Evans (born 7 March 1990) is an Australian footballer who currently plays for Floreat Athena FC.

Career
Dean signed on for his home town club Perth Glory's inaugural youth league team, and was a regular starter. He made his senior debut for Perth Glory as a substitute on 24 January 2009 against Queensland Roar.

Kitchee SC
On 1 July 2011, Dean Evans joined Kitchee SC as the Hong Kong League champions prepare for the defence of their league title and their first AFC Cup campaign. Evans' identity as an Asian expatriate will help Kitchee in the AFC Cup, allowing them to devote their overseas player quota to their Spanish legion. But after training with the club and two games with the team in the 2011 Barclays Asia Trophy, Dean Evans has been considered unsuitable for Kitchee's needs and therefore not been granted a contract.

Sham Shui Po SA
On 4 January 2012, Sham Shui Po SA announced they have signed Dean Evans for the remainder of the 2011–12 Hong Kong First Division League season. He made his debut for the club on 8 January 2012 against Hong Kong Sapling.

Perth Glory
On 9 September 2013, after a series of good play on Glory's recent tour of South Africa, Dean Evans rejoined his home town club Perth Glory as a three-month injury-replacement.

Career statistics

Honours
Personal honours
 Most Glorious Youth player: 2009–10
 Most Glorious Youth player: 2010–11

References

External links
 Perth Glory profile

1990 births
A-League Men players
Australian soccer players
Living people
Perth Glory FC players
Kitchee SC players
Hong Kong First Division League players
National Premier Leagues players
Association football midfielders